The W. T. Thorne Building, also known as Hostetler's Opera House, is a historic three-story building in Minden, Nebraska. It was built in 1891 by W. T. Thorne, and designed in the Renaissance Revival architectural style. It was named for Bruno 0. Hostetler, who served as the mayor of Kearney, Nebraska and a judge. It has been listed on the National Register of Historic Places since September 12, 1985.

References

National Register of Historic Places in Kearney County, Nebraska
Renaissance Revival architecture in Nebraska
Buildings and structures completed in 1891